Mahsa Saberi (born February 14, 1993, in Gorgan); She is a player of the Iran women's national volleyball team. In 2018, she joined to the Turkish club Balıkesir DSİ with Mona Ashofteh and she is currently a player of this club. She also has a history of playing for Sarmayeh Bank Tehran VC and winning the Iranian Super League. She plays as an Outside Hitter.

References

1993 births
Living people
Iranian women's volleyball players
People from Gorgan
Iranian expatriate sportspeople in Turkey
21st-century Iranian women